Granny Goose is an American brand of potato chips and other snack foods.

History
Granny Goose Foods, Inc. was founded in Oakland, California, by Matthew Barr in 1946. In 1993, the company acquired the Laura Scudder brand from Borden, Inc., but due to intense competition from PepsiCo's Frito-Lay and Anheuser-Busch's Eagle Snacks could not make a profit, so the entire company was put up for sale in 1995.

In 2000, the company moved most of its operations from its corporate headquarters in Oakland to Kaysville, Utah. That same year, Snak King acquired Granny Goose's corn chip, tortilla chip, popcorn, potato chip and extruded snack lines.

The Granny Goose potato chip line is produced by Shearer's Foods under license from Snak King.  Granny Goose products can be readily found in the Western United States.

In the Philippines, Granny Goose was known for its Tortillos and Kornets corn-based snacks manufactured by General Milling Corporation (GMC) under license from Granny Goose Foods Inc. since 1982. GMC would later acquire the trademark rights for the Philippines. In 2008, Universal Robina Corporation acquired the Granny Goose snack business of GMC.

Mascot and advertising
Its logo and mascot, also named Granny Goose, is an anthropomorphic cartoon goose. In a series of television commercials first aired in the 1960s, the company's spokesperson, who self-identified as "Granny Goose", was portrayed by actor Philip Carey as an ultra-masculine tough guy, depicted in the commercials as such manly stereotypes as a cowboy or a James Bond-style spy.

Products 

 Original Potato Chips
 Dip Potato Chips
 Sour Cream & Onion Potato Chips
 BBQ Potato Chips
 Onion Rings
 Corn Chips
 White Corn Tortilla Strips
 Restaurant Style Tortilla Chips
 Nacho Cheese Tortilla Chips
 Butter Popcorn
 Kettle Corn
 Cheese Popcorn
 Caramel Corn
 Jalapeño Cheddar Popcorn
 Cheese Puffs
 Cheese Nibbles
 Blazin' Hot Cheese Nibbles
 Ring Pretzels (discontinued)
 Tortillos (Philippines)
 Kornets (Philippines, discontinued)

See also
Pringles
Junk food

References

External links
Granny Goose USA

Snack food manufacturers of the United States
Brand name snack foods
Manufacturing companies based in Oakland, California
Food and drink companies established in 1946
1946 establishments in California
Fictional geese